The 2018 Ghazi Amanullah Khan Regional One Day Tournament was a List A cricket competition that took place in Afghanistan between 10 and 27 July 2018. It was the second edition of the competition to be played with List A status, following the announcements by the International Cricket Council (ICC) in February and May 2017. Six teams competed; Amo Region, Band-e-Amir Region, Boost Region, Kabul Region, Mis Ainak Region and Speen Ghar Region. Speen Ghar Region were the defending champions.

Following the group stage, Speen Ghar Region and Boost Region finished first and second respectively, and faced each other in the final. Boost Region won the match by five wickets to win the tournament.

Fixtures

Points table

 Team qualified for the final

Group stage

Final

References

External links
 Series home at ESPN Cricinfo

Ghazi
Ghazi Amanullah Khan Regional One Day Tournament